Micro Markets are a retail sector, closely tied to the vending machine industry, that utilizes automated self-checkout technology  to operate in locations that require unattended payment capability. Grab-and-go Micro Markets are unattended retail environments where consumers can purchase products from open shelves, coolers, or freezers. Consumers use a self-checkout kiosk to purchase their products,  or advanced AI technology that is leveraged to facilitate a seamless experience. They are a hybrid form of vending, foodservice, coffee service, and convenience stores that provide an improved customer experience, exponentially greater product variety, and increased sales within a single location, while keeping labor costs down and increasing operational efficiencies. Given the market sector in which Micro Markets exist, the National Automatic Merchandising Association (NAMA) “recognize[s] [Micro Markets] as one of its focus channels along with vending, foodservice and refreshment services". The COVID-19 pandemic is expected to drive innovation in the self-checkout model as vendors are looking for ways to provide safe, touchless, and easy-to-use self-checkout solutions to protect both employees and customers.

Micro Markets look and feel like modern convenience stores. However, they function as a hybrid of vending, foodservice, and refreshment services. They consist of an open rack display, reach-in refrigerated coolers or/and freezers, and a self-checkout kiosk. Consumers are able to pay using cash, credit/debit cards, or a stored value market account, typically accessed through a market card, email address, fingerprint, or mobile app.  

A single Micro Market can easily stock between 150 and 400 products, in contrast to a traditional vending machine, which can hold 40 products. Operators are able to take advantage of the additional products by catering to various diet restrictions (gluten-free, low-carb, etc.) According to Micro Market technology provider 365 Retail Markets, in addition to the increased product variety, the open flow and cashless payment options mean that consumers spend less time in line fumbling with change, purchase multiple items with one transaction, and spend four times as much per transaction than with cash.

Micro markets are an attractive segment of the vending industry for operators due to their profitability. A study conducted by micro market provider Parlevel Systems revealed that in a location with 125 employees, a micro market can generate on average over $1,000 per week. Furthermore, replacing vending machines with a micro market increases location sales by an average of 80%. 

As a result of the increased efficiency and convenience for both consumers and operators, Micro Market adoption has grown exponentially, often leading to the removal and replacement of banks of vending machines. Since their inception in 2005, Micro Markets have enjoyed a steady rise in adoption and sales, the most significant growth coming between 2012 and 2016. In that period of time, the number of active Micro Market locations grew 574 percent, from 2,642 locations in 2012 to 17,806 in 2016. Subsequently, Micro Market sales have increased 42 percent between 2015 and 2016 and account for 20 percent of total sales. Total sales for 2016 “included 456 million consumer transactions and 660 million plus product purchase".

Traditionally, Micro Markets function best in closed environments, such as breakrooms in offices where the employee count is between 150 and 500; sales in an office with fewer than 150 employees would not justify the cost of a Micro Market, and offices with more than 500 employees typically have onsite dining services. However, with the increased popularity of Micro Markets, and with the aid of innovations from technology providers, Micro Markets can be found on college campuses. Lower cost technology options like 365 Retail Markets’ "nanomarket"™ are making locations in locations with fewer than 150 patrons a financially viable option, while locations more than 500 patrons benefit from having a “grab and go” option that appeals to a wider variety of consumers.

According to one assessment:

References

Food retailing